Many ships have been named Italia including:

 , an Italian ironclad launched in 1880 and stricken in 1921
 , an Italian battleship launched in 1937 as Littorio she was renamed Italia in 1943
 , a passenger liner launched in 1928 as MS Kungsholm and named Italia from 1948 to 1964
 , a cruise ship launched in 1965 (later operated as Princess Italia)
 , an ocean liner converted by the French Navy to an armed boarding steamer and sunk in 1917
 Italia (yacht), a 12-metre class yacht which competed in the 1987 Louis Vuitton Cup
 , a 1993 sail ship

Ship names